Khezri-Dasht Bayaz (also known as Kezri, also Romanized as Kheẕrī, formerly, Shahabad, also Romanized as Shāhābād) is a city in Nimbolouk District, in Qaen County, South Khorasan Province, Iran. 

At the 2016 census, its population was 5,680.

References 

Populated places in Qaen County

Cities in South Khorasan Province